Emmalin Pierre is a politician from the island of Grenada. She served in the Senate of Grenada for five years (November 2003 - July 2008), and was long active in youth development. She served as the country's Minister for Youth Development during her time as a Senator. She was defeated in the 8 July 2008 elections in the constituency of Saint Andrew South East by newcomer Patrick Simmons of the NDC by 30 votes (Simmons 1637 - Pierre 1607). After 2008 she worked throughout the Caribbean as a consultant on youth development with specific focus on the development of youth policies.

In the 19 February 2013 general election, Pierre once again stood against Simmons and this time defeated him by 795 votes (Simmons 1182 - Pierre 1977). She was sworn in on 3 March 2013, once again as Grenada's Minister of Youth with added responsibilities of Sport and Ecclesiastic Affairs. She is Grenada's first female Minister of Sport.
In the March 13th, 2018, general election she once again faced Patrick Simmons and defeated him.

She now serves as Minister of Education.

She is married to ASP Tafawa Pierre of the Royal Grenada Police Force and is the mother of three boys.

References
 Candidate profile on party website

Year of birth missing (living people)
Living people
Members of the Senate of Grenada
Government ministers of Grenada
New National Party (Grenada) politicians
Women government ministers of Grenada